Margaret MacArthur (7 May 1928 – 23 May 2006) was an American singer and player of the Appalachian dulcimer.

Biography 
Margaret MacArthur was born in Chicago. As a youngster, she moved around with her family - in California, Louisiana, and Arizona. She remembered that at the age of five she heard cowboys on the timber crew singing folk songs in the Tonto National Forest. She studied at Hutchins College of the University of Chicago. In 1948 she married John MacArthur and moved to Newfane, Vermont. She remained in Vermont for the rest of her life. In 1951 the couple moved into a 200-year-old farmhouse in Marlboro, Vermont. For the first 6 years there was no electricity or running water. In preparation for the move, she bought "Country Songs of Vermont" (1937) by Helen Hartness Flanders. It became the model for her future folk-song collecting. MacArthur volunteered to teach music at the school her children attended.  She found old ballads appealing and she sought out traditional singers in the Vermont area. By 1951 she had performed several times on local radio.

In 1960 an 80-year-old neighbor gave her an old harp-zither. Her husband repaired it and customized it. Margaret became an expert player. An instrument manufacturer was impressed and obtained permission to manufacture copies of it, calling it the "MacArthur Harp". This had originally been manufactured in 1900 under the trade name "Harp-O-Chord". There are photographs of the original harp-O-chord, the harp zither, and the modern reproduction on this page: Fretless zithers.

In 1962 she signed to Folkways Records. Her first album, "Folksongs of Vermont", was recorded in her kitchen. "On the Mountains High" (1972) contains 8 songs that she collected in Vermont. Her 1976 album "The Old Songs" features vocal and guitar accompaniment from Gordon Bok. Members of her family appear on most of her albums. In 1990 and 1991 she was artist-in-residence with the Vermont Council of the Arts.

She was a teacher of the lap dulcimer, and frequently appeared at festivals, coffee houses, and community events. In 1985 at the New England arts biennial, officials named MacArthur as one of seven "living art treasures of New England." In 1997 she represented Vermont at the Kennedy Center in a national celebration of the arts. In 2001 "Yankee Magazine" voted "Vermont Ballads and Broadsides" as one of "The Yankee Top 40" of all time. In 2003 she performed at the Brattleboro Free Folk Festival. Margaret MacArthur died in the Spring of 2006. After her death, a series of tribute concerts was given. Performers included The Boys of the Lough and Gordon Bok. She appears briefly in the video "The West Virginia Hills: A Tribute to the Mountain Dulcimer".

The Margaret MacArthur Collection, consisting of personal papers, books, her field recordings of traditional singers in Vermont, and materials gifted to her by Helen Hartness Flanders, resides in the archive of the Vermont Folklife Center in Middlebury, VT.

Bibliography
 How to Play the MacArthur Harp and all Numerical Harp-Zithers (1987) (book and cassette)
 The Vermont Heritage Songbook (Editor) (1994).

Discography
 "Folksongs of Vermont" (1962)
 "On The Mountains High" (1972)
 "The Old Songs" (1976)
 "An Almanac of New England Farm Songs" (1982)
 "Make the Wildwood Ring" (1982)
 "Vermont Ballads and Broadsides" (1989)
 "MacArthur Road" (1989)
 "Them Stars" (1995)
 "Ballads Thrice Twisted" (1999)

References

Sources

External links

 MargaretMacArthur.com (official website)

1928 births
2006 deaths
American folk singers
Appalachian dulcimer players
American folk-song collectors
People from Windham County, Vermont
20th-century American singers
University of Chicago alumni